Sir Maddur Kantharaj Urs (20 September 1870 – 3 October 1923) was an Indian royal, civil servant, and  administrator who served as the 20th Diwan of Mysore from 1918 to 1922.

Early life and education 

Kantharaj Urs was born on 20 September 1870 to Narasaraja Urs and Kempananjammanni, the Maddur Urs branch of the Kalale Wadiyar dynasty. His older sister was Maharani Kempananjammanni Devi.

He studied at Madras Christian College from 1892 to 1893 and graduated with distinction. He was the first member of the Ursu community to attain this distinction.

Career 

In 1894, Kantharaj Urs was appointed Probationary Assistant Commissioner (Schedule II) in the Mysore civil service. After the untimely death of his brother-in-law Maharaja Chamaraja Wadiyar X in December 1894, his sister became the Queen Regent of Mysore in 1895. She appointed him her Special Assistant and Private Secretary from 1895 to 1899.

In 1928, Urs succeeded Sir M. Vishveshwaraya as the Diwan of Mysore to his nephew Maharaja Krishnaraja Wadiyar IV.

Personal life 

Kantharaj Urs married his niece Princess Jayalakshami Amanni, the eldest daughter of his sister Maharani Kempananjammani Devi. They had one daughter, Rajakumari Lelavathi. Jayalakshmi Vilas Mansion at Mysore, now part of the University of Mysore, was their residence.

He died on 3 October 1923.

References 

 
 

CSI
1870 births
1923 deaths
Madras Christian College alumni
Diwans of Mysore
Knights Commander of the Order of the Indian Empire
Indian knights